154th Division or 154th Infantry Division may refer to:

 154th Division (People's Republic of China)
 154th Division (Imperial Japanese Army)
 154th Infantry Division (Wehrmacht)
 Italian 154th Garrison Division